Long Way Around may refer to:
 "The Long Way Around", a 2006 song by the Dixie Chicks
 Long Way Around (album), an album by Chris Whitley
 "Long Way Around", a song by Eagle-Eye Cherry, from the album Living in the Present Future

See also
Long Way Round, a British television series and book documenting Ewan McGregor and Charley Boorman's motorcycle journey